This is a list of episodes for the Japanese anime series Neo Angelique Abyss, produced by Yumeta Company.
The episodes are directed by Shin Katagai with series composed by Yuka Yamada and fictitious characters drawn by Maki Fujioka.

The episodes first began airing on TV Tokyo on April 6, 2008 and subsequently on other stations. Two pieces of theme music are used for the anime; one for the opening theme and one for the ending theme. The opening theme, "Joy to the World" is sung by Hiroki Takahashi, Toru Ohkawa, Masaya Onosaka, and Daisuke Ono. The ending theme, "Ai Ai Gasa" (アイアイ傘, "Ai Ai Gasa"?) is performed by Tegomass.

A sequel to the first season of the anime has been announced by KOEI, the creators of the Angelique series and games. The second season Neo Angelique Abyss -Second Age- immediately followed the first.

List of Neo Angelique ~Abyss~ episodes

List of Neo Angelique Abyss -Second Age- episodes

References

External links
Official Anime Website (Japanese)

Noblesse Oblige
Announcement of the second season dubbed Neo Angelique Abyss -Second Age-

Neo Angelique ~Abyss~